Gabriel Hernán Rojas (born 22 June 1997) is an Argentine professional footballer who plays as a left-back for Racing Club de Avellaneda in the Argentine Primera División.

Club career
Rojas had youth periods with Club Arzeno and Atletico Pueyrredón, prior to joining San Lorenzo in 2005. His senior career got underway with Argentine Primera División side San Lorenzo in 2016. He made his first-team debut on 17 November 2016 during a Copa Argentina defeat to Gimnasia y Esgrima, which was followed by his first Primera División appearance on 25 March 2017 against Quilmes. Overall, Rojas made eighteen appearances in his first campaign with San Lorenzo. In July 2019, Rojas departed on loan to Uruguay with Peñarol. After debuting in a win over Danubio, he appeared twenty-three times in twelve months there. On April 9th, 2021, Rojas scored a spectacular overhead kick from the edge of the 18 yard box in the 75th minute against Platense to put San Lorenzo 3-2 up.  Many journalists stated that it could well be the next FIFA Puskás Award winning goal.

International career
Rojas represented Argentina at U20 at the 2016 COTIF Tournament in Spain. He won three caps, versus Qatar, Venezuela and Spain respectively.

Career statistics

References

External links

1997 births
Living people
People from Burzaco
Argentine footballers
Argentina youth international footballers
Argentina under-20 international footballers
Association football defenders
Argentine expatriate footballers
Expatriate footballers in Uruguay
Argentine expatriate sportspeople in Uruguay
Argentine Primera División players
Uruguayan Primera División players
San Lorenzo de Almagro footballers
Peñarol players
Sportspeople from Buenos Aires Province